Utkalmani Gopabandhu Institute of Engineering (UGIE) is a State Governmental Diploma Engineering  Institution in the western Zone of Odisha, which was established in 1962 under the Directorate of Technical Education and Training, Odisha also known as DTET.

The Institute is  affiliated with the All India Council of Technical Education, New Delhi and State Council for Technical Education & Vocational Training recognized under the state government of Odisha.

Overview

The Institute was started by the state Government of Odisha, under the department of Industries in 1962, with the name Composite Polytechnic, Rourkela.

Brief History

The Institution was started by the Government of Odisha under the Industries Department in the year 1962 and was named "Composite Polytechnic", Rourkela. In the year 1966, the name was changed to "Rourkela Polytechnic" and again in 1968 the institution was renamed "State Technological Institute", Rourkela. Subsequently, in the year 1976 the name was changed to UTKALMANI GOPABANDHU INSTITUTE OF ENGINEERING, Rourkela (UGIE).
 
The institute is located in the tribal belt of the state of Odisha and was to cater to the needs of Rourkela Steel Plant along with other industries of the State. It was the only institution in Eastern India imparting Diploma Engineering in Chemical and Metallurgical branches. The institute got another feather on its cap by introducing Ceramic Technology in the year 1995 for the first time in Eastern India.LocationThe Institution is located in the Industrial Estate on the foothills of Rourkela (Dist. Sundargarh). It is about 8 km. from the Main Road, near STI Chowk and 6 km. west of Rourkela Railway Station. There prevails a peaceful academic environment. Rourkela is 415 km. from Kolkata, on the Kolkata - Mumbai main line, 514 km from Bhubaneswar by road.About Rourkela

Rourkela is an important industrial city of Odisha and is famous for the Mega Steel Plant, i.e. Rourkela Steel Plant under the Steel Authority of India Ltd. It is well connected by road, rail and airways. It is about 340 km from Kolkata by rail and 483 km from Bhubaneswar by road.

Courses offered 

The Institute offers a 3-year Diploma in Engineering in the branches as below.
Mechanical Engineering 
Civil Engineering
Chemical Engineering
Ceramic Technology
Electrical Engineering 
Metallurgical Engineering
Electronics & Telecommunication Engineering

Annual intake

Placements
The Training and Placement Cell helps get students placed in multinational companies (MNCs) and Indian Companies.

Gallery

References

External links

State Council for Technical Education & Vocational Training
All India Council for Technical Education
Engineering colleges in Odisha
Universities and colleges in Rourkela
Educational institutions established in 1962
1962 establishments in Orissa